"Selfish" is a song by American recording artist PnB Rock. It was released on June 23, 2016 by Atlantic Records and serves as the lead single from his mixtape GTTM: Goin Thru the Motions. The song was produced by Needlz and Donut.

Background
While talking about the song in an interview with The Fader, Rock said:

"I wrote this song about one specific girl who I was chilling with in the studio. This song really started as me just singing to her, being smooth and shit. I didn't think anything of it until it was stuck in my head so I had to get in the booth and record it. It's funny because I don't even speak to the girl anymore."

Critical reception
David Drake of Complex wrote that this song is "as sincere as "Trap Queen," and "as attuned to the vulnerability of love, but rather than striding through the airwaves towards No. 1, it seduces, earning your trust over time".

Music video 
The song's accompanying music video premiered on December 17, 2016 on PnB Rock's account on YouTube.

Charts

Weekly charts

Year-end charts

Certifications

References

2016 singles
2016 songs
PnB Rock songs
Atlantic Records singles
Songs written by Needlz
Songs written by Brandon Bell (record producer)